John Bauldie (23 August 1949 – 22 October 1996) was a British journalist, noted as one of the foremost experts on the work of Bob Dylan. He was editor of the Dylan fanzine The Telegraph, and was also on the launch staff of Q magazine. On the magazine website, Bauldie claimed that Dylan was a regular reader of The Telegraph. Bauldie died in controversial circumstances in a helicopter crash with the businessman Matthew Harding, having watched his favourite football team, Bolton Wanderers, defeat Chelsea. The crash enquiry found that the pilot was not qualified to fly on instruments in the fog of the crash night.

References

External links 
 The Telegraph website
 BBC report on crash enquiry BBC news web-site 

1949 births
1996 deaths
Bob Dylan
English male journalists
English writers about music
Victims of aviation accidents or incidents in England
Victims of aviation accidents or incidents in 1996
Victims of helicopter accidents or incidents